Luis Ignacio Quinteros Gasset (born 23 April 1979) is a former Chilean football striker.

His previous clubs include Colo-Colo, Universidad Católica and Huachipato in Chile, Colón de Santa Fe and Gimnasia de La Plata in Argentina and Mexican sides Puebla F.C. and Club León.

Honours

Club
Colo-Colo
 Primera División de Chile (4): 1996, 1997 Clausura, 1998, 2002 Clausura
 Copa Chile (1): 1996
 Deportes Temuco
Primera B (1): 2001
Universidad Católica
 Primera División de Chile (1): 2005 Clausura

References

External links
 Argentine Primera statistics  
 

1979 births
Living people
Footballers from Santiago
Chilean footballers
Chilean expatriate footballers
Chile international footballers
Colo-Colo footballers
Colo-Colo B footballers
Club Puebla players
Club Deportivo Universidad Católica footballers
Club León footballers
Club Atlético Colón footballers
Club de Gimnasia y Esgrima La Plata footballers
Lobos BUAP footballers
C.D. Huachipato footballers
Unión Temuco footballers
Unión La Calera footballers
Deportes Copiapó footballers
Chilean Primera División players
Tercera División de Chile players
Liga MX players
Argentine Primera División players
Ascenso MX players
Expatriate footballers in Argentina
Chilean expatriate sportspeople in Argentina
Expatriate footballers in Mexico
Chilean expatriate sportspeople in Mexico
Association football forwards